Mare Jonio may refer to:

 The Ionian Sea (in Italian)
 , a tug ship launched in 1943 as Empress Belle
 Mare Jonio (rescue ship), originally constructed as a tugboat in 1972